E. Axel Andersson (19 June 1887 – 17 August 1951) was a Swedish athlete.  He competed at the 1908 Summer Olympics in London. In the 1500 metres, Andersson placed sixth of seven in his initial semifinal heat and did not advance to the final.

References

Sources
 
 
 

1887 births
1951 deaths
Swedish male middle-distance runners
Olympic athletes of Sweden
Athletes (track and field) at the 1908 Summer Olympics